Zöllner (literally "toll keeper") is a German surname. Notable people with the surname include:

 Antje Jackelén, née Zöllner, Lutheran theologian and Archbishop of Uppsala
 Johann Karl Friedrich Zöllner (1834–1882), German astronomer
Zöllner illusion
Zöllner (crater)
 Carl Friedrich Zöllner (1800–1860), German composer
 Carl Heinrich Zöllner (1792–1836), German composer
 Frank Zöllner (born 1956), German art historian and professor
 Fred Zollner (1901–1982), founder and co-owner of the Fort Wayne Zollner Pistons
 Heinrich Zöllner (1854–1941), German composer, conductor and librettist
 Robert Zoellner, American stamp collector
 Simon Zöllner (1821–1880), Australian metal manufacturer
 Tom Zoellner (born 1968), American author

Variant "Zollner" without umlaut
 Gudrun Zollner (born 1960), German politician
 Hans Zollner (born 1966), German theologian and psychologist, Vatican official
 Matthias Zollner (born 1981), German basketball coach
Zollner, or Zollner Elektronik AG, a German electronics manufacturer founded by :de:Manfred Zollner

German-language surnames